Claire Messud (born 1966) is an American novelist and literature and creative writing professor. She is best known as the author of the novel The Emperor's Children (2006).

Early life
Born in Greenwich, Connecticut, Messud grew up in the United States, Australia, and Canada, returning to the United States as a teenager. Messud's mother is Canadian, and her father is a Pied-noir from French Algeria. She was educated at the University of Toronto Schools and Milton Academy. She did undergraduate and graduate studies at Yale University and Cambridge University, where she met her spouse James Wood. 

In 1989, after her two years at Cambridge ended, Messud entered the M.F.A. program at Syracuse University, thought she soon felt that that endeavor was not a good fit for her aspirations, as all the other students, in addition to being older, and "already married and sometimes getting divorced" were heavily interested in American authors whose work she was not yet familiar with, such as Charles Baxter, Leonard Michaels, and Ann Beattie. Messud's literary tastes were steeped more toward the experimental female authors with which her mother had raised her, such as Katherine Mansfield, Djuna Barnes, [[Elizabeth Bowen], Jean Rhys.

Career
Messud's debut novel, When The World Was Steady (1995), was nominated for the PEN/Faulkner Award. In 1999, she published her second book, The Last Life, about three generations of a French-Algerian family. Her 2001 work, The Hunters, consists of two novellas. The Emperor's Children, which Messud wrote while a fellow at the Radcliffe Institute for Advanced Study in 2004–2005, was critically praised and became a New York Times bestseller, as well as being longlisted for the 2006 Man Booker Prize. In April 2013, Messud published her sixth novel, The Woman Upstairs. Her 2017 novel, The Burning Girl, was named one of the best books of the year by the Los Angeles Times. 

Messud has taught creative writing at Amherst College, Kenyon College, University of Maryland, Yale University, in the Warren Wilson College MFA Program for Writers in North Carolina, in the Graduate Writing program at Johns Hopkins University, and at Harvard University.  Messud also taught at Sewanee: The University of the South in Sewanee, Tennessee. She is on the editorial board of the literary magazine The Common, based at Amherst College.  She has contributed articles to publications such as The New York Review of Books.

In 2009, Messud began teaching a literary traditions course each spring semester as a part of CUNY Hunter College's MFA Program in Creative Writing. She subsequently taught creative writing at other schools, including the University of Maryland and Johns Hopkins University.

Personal life
Messud has two children, Livia and Lucian.

Awards
The American Academy of Arts and Letters has recognized Messud's talent with both an Addison Metcalf Award and a Strauss Living Award.  She was considered for the 2003 Granta Best of Young British Novelists list, although none of the three passports she holds is British. As of 2010–2011, she is a fellow at the Wissenschaftskolleg zu Berlin / Institute of Advanced Study.

Bibliography
 
 
 
 The Professor's History, Picador, 2006, 
 
 (longlisted for the 2013 Scotiabank Giller Prize)

References

Further reading

External links

 

1966 births
Living people
20th-century American novelists
21st-century American novelists
American women novelists
American people of Canadian descent
Milton Academy alumni
Yale University alumni
Writers from Greenwich, Connecticut
University of Maryland, College Park faculty
Kenyon College faculty
Amherst College faculty
Johns Hopkins University faculty
American people of French descent
20th-century American women writers
21st-century American women writers
PEN/Faulkner Award for Fiction winners
American expatriates in Australia
Novelists from Maryland
Novelists from Ohio
Novelists from Massachusetts
Novelists from Connecticut
American women academics
People educated at Kambala School